Chodov is a town in Sokolov District in the Karlovy Vary Region of the Czech Republic. It has about 13,000 inhabitants.

Administrative parts
The village of Stará Chodovská is an administrative part of Chodov.

Etymology
The name is derived from the personal Slavic name Chod, meaning "the village of Chod's people".

Geography
It lies in the Sokolov Basin. The Chodovský Stream flows through the town. There are several bodies of water in the municipal territory, most notably the artificial lake Bílá voda, used for recreational purposes.

History
Chodov was originally a Slavic settlement. The Slavic colonisation was not successful and in the Middle Ages this part of Bohemia was colonised by Germans. In the 12th–13th century Chodov belonged to the Waldsassen Abbey and in the 14th–17th century was ruled from Loket. In 1894 Chodov was promoted to a town and got the right to use its own coat of arms.

From 1938 to 1945 it was annexed by Nazi Germany and asministered as part of Reichsgau Sudetenland. Until the end of World War II the town was inhabited mostly by Germans. after the war, the German population was expelled and the town was resettled by Czechs. In the 1960s a big chemical factory was built in nearby Vřesová and then new housing estates were built for Czech and Slovak workers who moved here.

Demographics

Sights

The most significant building is the Church of St. Lawrence, built by the constructor Johann Wolfgang Braunbock. It was built in the Baroque style in 1725–1733. In the interior there is a Stations of the Cross, which consists of fourteen large canvases. It is the work of regional artists from the 18th and 19th centuries, which is rare in its dimensions and its age.

In front of the church there is the early Baroque statue of St. Sebastian from 1673. Another early Baroque statue is the Virgin Mary on the Marian column from 1675, located on the town square.

The other church in the town belongs to the Evangelical Church of Czech Brethren.

Notable people
Willi Huttig (1909–2001), German photographer and alpinist

Twin towns – sister cities

Chodov is twinned with:
 Oelsnitz, Germany
 Waldsassen, Germany

References

External links

Cities and towns in the Czech Republic
Populated places in Sokolov District